Dewi Sant (Welsh) may refer to:

Saint David
Dewi Sant, an oratorio by Arwel Hughes
Dewi Sant, a work for SATB chorus and orchestra by Karl Jenkins (1999, 30 minutes)
 Dewi Sant Hospital in Pontypridd, Wales